A Desperate Adventure may refer to:
 A Desperate Adventure (1924 film)
 A Desperate Adventure (1938 film)